Kārkāthār  (also known as Kaarukaatha Vellalar) is a Hindu caste in the Indian state of Tamil Nadu.

Etymology

It could also mean 'one who is dependent on rain', as  means 'raincloud' and  means 'to wait for' in Tamil.

History

In the years that immediately followed the Sangam age (from third to sixth century CE), the Tamil lands were ruled by a dynasty called Kalabhras. Scholar and historian M. Raghava Iyengar identifies the Kalabhras with the Kalappalar section of the Vellalar and equates king Achyuta Vikranta with Achyuta Kalappala the father of Meykandar who hailed from the Kaarukaathar community. Buddhadatta, the Pali writer who stayed in the Chola kingdom and authored Buddhist manuals refers (in the Nigamanagātha of Vinayavinicchaya, verse 3179) to his patron Achyuta Vikranta who was then (fifth century CE) ruling the Chola kingdom as Kalamba-kula nandane meaning the favourite of the Kalamba family. In Pali language as in Tamil, the word Kalamba or Kalambam (in Tamil) means the Kadamba tree, the sacred totemic symbol that is associated with Tamil god Murugan.

According to tradition, the Karkathar migrated from the Gangetic plains and over time spread over the entire macro region of present-day Tamil Nadu. According to satakams, the Pandya country was settled by these people after they had resided in the Chola country. According to historian Burton Stein, this theory is purely mythical.

Historian Usha R. Vijailakshmi observes that Verse 34 of the Karmandala Satakam connects the origin of the Gangas to the origin of the Karakatha Vellalas of southern Karnataka, as follows: 
 
The names Bhupālar, Dhanapālar, and Gopālar refer to the three subdivisions of Vaishyas. They derive from word-elements associated with each occupational sub-group. For the agriculturists,  is used. This refers to the earth, as with the Hindu goddess who represents earth, Bhūmi,.

According to anthropologist Nicholas B. Dirks, the Pudukottai region was sparsely populated until the early Chola period. But with the beginning of the Chola era, there is strong evidence of increasing agrarian settlement, the growth of villages, institutions, the construction and expansion of temples. According to the Tekkattur manuscript, the Karkathar were initially divided into Kanāttars and Kōnāttars, each of which had many exogamous sub-divisions. Kōnādu or the land of the king (Chola country) mostly consisted of the regions north of the river Vellar except for the western part of the state where it included certain regions south of the river as well. Kanādu, literally meaning the land of the forests was included in the Pandya country. The manuscript goes on to describe the decline in the position of the Karkathar after the initial golden age due to the fighting between the two branches over various issues such as land, rights to the water of the river Vellar, temples etc. and the subsequent settlement and dominance of the Maravars in the region who were initially imported from Ramnad by both branches. The copper plate inscriptions held by every Maravar community in the region indicates that the Kōnāttu vellalar were victorious in the end.

According to historian Arokiaswami, the Irukkuvels of Kodumbalur who were the main allies of the Cholas from an early period were all Vellalars. According to Dirks, the local sources like palm leaf manuscripts, copper plate inscriptions and many of the origin stories also indicate that there was a relationship between the Irukkuvel family of chieftains and the Karkathar vellalar community and he says, that the Irukkuvel titles such as Vēlār as in Madurantaka Irukkuvēlār, Śembiyan Irukkuvēlār, etc. proves that the Irukkuvels were indeed Vellalar. Stein disputes Arokiaswami's claim that the Irukkuvels were Vellalar.

Caste structure

The caste is composed of ninety six patrilineal exogamous clans or gotras, sixty nine of which end in the title Udaiyan, fourteen ending in Rayan and thirteen ending in Thiraiyan.

As founders of Saivite Mutts

Gnanasambandhar, the founder of the Saivite mutt Dharmapuram Adheenam that historically managed temples like the Thyagaraja temple at Thiruvarur hailed from this community.

Distribution
Areas of Karkathar population have included:

 Thanjavur. Kumbakonam, Ariyalur , Thirupanandal, Nagapattinam , Thiruvarur , Mayavaram, Trichy, Chidambaram, Pudukottai, Tirunelveli, Cuddalore, Villupuram districts.
 Attur and Omalur taluks of Salem district.

Notable people

Meykanda Devar, the son of Achyuta Kalappaalar and the author of the Saivite scripture Sivagnana bodham hailed from this community.

See also 

Vellalar
Velar (caste)
Kongu vellalar
Thuluva vellala

References
Citations

Bibliography

Further reading
 
 
 

Vellalar
Social groups of Tamil Nadu
Vegetarian communities